Kathleen Marie Ireland (born March 20, 1963) is an American author, entrepreneur, fashion designer, philanthropist, and former fashion model. Ireland was a supermodel in the 1980s and 1990s, initially known for appearing in 13 consecutive Sports Illustrated swimsuit issues, including 3 covers. In 1993, she founded a brand licensing company, kathy ireland Worldwide (kiWW), which has made her one of the wealthiest former models in the world. As a result of her career in business, she earned a $420 million personal fortune by 2015. In 2021 alone, her company generated retail sales of $3.1 billion. The brand became ranked number 15 in the world and Ireland entered the Licensing Hall of Fame.

Early life
Kathy Ireland was born in Glendale, California, the middle child of three daughters. Ireland's parents are John and Barbara Ireland, a labor relationships executive and a nurse, respectively. The family moved to Santa Barbara, where they continue to live today.

Modeling, film and television career

Modeling
When Ireland was sixteen in 1979, she was scouted at her high school by Elite Model Management.

She has appeared on covers for Vogue, Cosmopolitan, Shape Fitness, Harper's Bazaar, Mademoiselle, Teen and Seventeen. Forbes, and Mademoiselle.

According to Ireland, a photographer once "crossed the line" with her when she was a teenager and wanted her to pose topless.  She did not feel comfortable and he did not respect her "no."  He reportedly pushed her and got physical and she "decked him."

During Sports Illustrated swimsuit's 50th Anniversary event, Ireland's 1989 cover was awarded "The Greatest Sports Illustrated Swimsuit Cover Of All Time" by its publisher.

Ireland's successful transformation from a cover girl to a multimillion-dollar entrepreneur has been explicitly cited as inspiring by several active fashion models. After appearing on the cover of Sports Illustrated magazine in 2012, in a subsequent Today show interview, Kate Upton stated that she would like to follow in the footsteps of other cover girls, specifically Heidi Klum and Ireland. Three years later, in an interview with Matt Lauer, Hannah Jeter, the 2015 Sports Illustrated swimsuit cover model, likewise stated that she "would like to model [her] career after someone like Kathy Ireland." Ireland has also been cited as a role model by US model and entrepreneur Ashley Graham, who has singled her out as "one of her favourite people to follow on Instagram," because of her morally conscious online presence and business savvy.

Film and television
Ireland has appeared in a number of television and movie roles. Her first movie, 1988's Alien from L.A., was later featured during the fifth season of Mystery Science Theater 3000.

Ireland's other appearances include Melrose Place, Boy Meets World, The Larry Sanders Show, Muppets Tonight, Side Out, Mr. Destiny, Necessary Roughness, Mom and Dad Save the World, National Lampoon's Loaded Weapon 1 (as Miss. Destiny Demeanor), Once Upon a Christmas, and its sequel Twice Upon a Christmas.

She also participated in the ninth season of Dancing with the Stars, where Ireland and her partner Tony Dovolani were the third couple eliminated in the second week of competition. Kathy has two TV series, Worldwide Business and Modern Living, which air on Fox Business and Bloomberg.

In 2016, she made an appearance in the sixth episode of the fourth season of The Profit, offering advice for the CEO of Murchison-Hume, Max Kater.

Entrepreneurship

Kathy Ireland Worldwide
Founded in 1993 as a brand marketing firm in an exclusive business relationship with Kmart, kathy ireland Worldwide (or kiWW, for short) became a global licensor after cutting its ties to the department store chain in 2003. In 2019, it stood at No. 26 on License Global's "Top 150 Global Licensors" 2019 list with $2.6 billion in retail sales.

1993-2003: Foundation and the Kmart years
In 1993, Kathy Ireland's name on a line of socks sold 100 million pairs and Kmart took notice, subsequently giving Ireland her own clothing line including swimwear, active wear, accessories, sweaters and more.

Buoyed by the initial success, Ireland founded kathy ireland Worldwide, at the beginning a brand marketing firm, which she and her related trusts own in its entirety. The company concentrated on building its business in home products after 2003, when it cut its exclusive ties to Kmart.

2003-2013: Continuous growth
 At the advice of Warren Buffett, Ireland's friend and mentor, kathy ireland Worldwide soon entered into the home furnishings business. "Fashion and apparel is consistently changing, but in home it's more consistent," Buffett said.

Already in 2004, Ireland's annual take was thought to be around $10 million. Forbes described Ireland as a "prototype for model-turned-mogul" in a 2006 article about the trend of modelpreneurs. By 2004, kathy ireland Worldwide was marketing products from 16 manufacturers - including those of Nourison and Pacific Coast Lighting - selling them in over 34,000 retail locations in as many as 14 countries.

Between 2005 and 2012, products bearing Ireland's brand generated $2 billion in annual retail sales and the company became a leader in its industry. In a May 2012 British Vogue article, Ireland was called the world's richest model.

Afterwards Ireland started designing wedding dresses and social occasion gowns. She launched her line of wedding gowns by presenting a runway fashion show at the Festival of Brides held in Disneyland Resort in 2012. Sterling/Winters Company is a wholly owned subsidiary of kathy ireland Worldwide, which is the management company for Janet Jackson.

American Legend launched a Kathy Ireland collection consisting of 30 styles, which was featured at Macy's beginning in Fall 2011. Ireland is chief designer for Royal Footwear & Accessories (The RFA Group). She has established a relationship with manufacturer Gorham designing dinnerware, glassware and flatware.

Ireland designed collections of jewelry inspired by Elizabeth Taylor. Ireland launched a collection of pet products called Loved Ones, which includes furniture, bowls, collars, toys and luxury bedding. She teamed up with Worldwise Inc., a pet products company based in San Rafael, California, to create the pet collection.

2013-present: Strategic relationships
In 2013, kathy ireland Worldwide entered into a licensing agreement with rug manufacturer Nourison, to create a new collection of affordable area rugs. Since that time, Kathy Ireland Home by Nourison has expanded to include more than 20 distinct rug collections.

In 2015, Forbes named Ireland one of America's 50 most successful self-made women (as measured by their net worth) in its first ever list of the kind. Lending her name to several thousands of different products, her company was listed as the 26th biggest licensor in the world in 2019 by License Global. Media has compared Kathy favourably to Martha Stewart, Kathy responded that Stewart's "designs are perfect and ours are messy".

In 2016, in association with Paul Raps New York, Yaron Turgeman from Taly Diamonds and Roland Krainz from Krainz Creations, Kathy Ireland launched "Diamonds by Kathy Ireland", a collection of sixty-five jewelry pieces: engagement rings, wedding bands, patent-pending earrings, bracelets and pendants. The collection premiered at the 2017 Luxury and JCK shows in Las Vegas.

In January 2017, Ireland teamed with Michael Amini to create a new home-furnishings line. The line, consisting of  bedroom pieces, occasional tables, couches, chairs and dining sets, debuted in October 2017, at the High Point Market trade show.
Also in January 2017, American Family Insurance tapped Kathy Ireland for an ambassador role. To launch their relationship, Ireland was the keynote speaker for their Dream Fearlessly campaign. In July 2018, Fox Business reported that Ireland had ventured into the shipping container business, partnering with SG Blocks, a company which has been designing and constructing container-based buildings and structures in the United States.

On May 8, 2019, singer and actress Vanessa Williams signed a management and partnership agreement with Kathy Ireland Worldwide.

In late 2019, Padlist launched with Kathy Ireland as the Chief Editor & Brand Strategist alongside Co-Founders Blake Van Leer and Lindsay Van Leer. In 2020, Ireland's company entered into a partnership with Camping World to bring her collections of RV furniture to retail locations and online stores. Camping World does $4 plus billion worldwide and operates over 180 retail/service locations in 46 states.

In February 2022 Kathy Ireland teamed up with Bagatelle for Outerwear, Dresses and Denim

Other projects

Record label

In April 2021, Marilyn McCoo and Billy Davis Jr. released a new album called Blackbird Lennon-McCartney Icons for the first time in 30 years under Ireland's record label EE1 in partnership with BMG. It was produced by Nic Mendoza. The album hit No 1 on its first day on the iTunes R&B Album chart. Kathy called the project a human rights and freedom, including religious freedom, recording project in 2021.

Fitness videos
Since 1994, Ireland has published several fitness videos that led to her design of athletic apparel and launched her brand licensing of fitness equipment. Several of these were VSDA Award-winning, including Total Fitness Workout, Core Workout, Absolutely Fit, Advanced Sports Fitness, Reach and Health and Body Specifics, which was awarded Fitness Video Of The Year.

Writing
Ireland has written numerous books, most of them for children. Her debut effort (with Laura Morton), Powerful Inspirations: Eight Lessons that Will Change Your Life, was published in 2002. Real Solutions for Busy Moms: Your Guide to Success and Sanity and Real Solutions: 52 God Inspired Messages from My Heart were published in 2009. Mona's Favorite Words, What Do Mommies Do? and An Angel Called Hope, her first three children's books, were released in November 2005. Since 2013, she has published few more for Bendon: Where Are the Bears, Choo-Choo Colors, Who Wears What, P-O-T-T-Y, Gracie & Delilah: A Tale of Two Precious Pups, and the three-book collection A Big Kid Book Set, consisting of Proud to Potty, Brush Up and Tubbie Time. She has also written six more "blocky books", published by Bendon as well: Cow, Sheep, and Pig, from the "Farm Friends Blocky Books" series and Giraffe, Lion, and Zebra, from the "Safari Friends Blocky Books" series. In 2020, Ireland released her first novel Fashion Jungle with author Rachel Van Dyken. The novel is based on events from her career in the modeling industry.

Public speaking
Ireland  spoke at the fourth Youth Assembly at the United Nations Headquarters on August 13, 2007, encouraging young people to engage in activities aimed at ending poverty. She delivered the keynote at Licensing International Expo 2012 in Las Vegas.

Ireland was a key speaker at the 2012 AIPAC policy conference in Washington, DC, where she expressed her support for the Israeli people and warned against the dangers posed by the lack of knowledge about the history of the land of Israel.

Philanthropy
Kathy Ireland's charity work and philanthropic activities have included pro bono work for the non-profit organizations March of Dimes, PTA, Feed the Children and City of Hope.

In addition, Ireland has lent her estates to charitable organizations such as the US Marine Corps' Toys for Tots to generate funds for charity. According to Major Bill Grein of the US Marine Corps, Ireland's company and her book business partner Bendon Publishing International donated $10 million to supplement the 2013 annual Toys for Tots gathering and distribution of Christmas gifts for millions of at-risk children and youths.

On World AIDS Day 2017, Ireland donated $100,000 to the Elizabeth Taylor AIDS Foundation (ETAF).

Friendship with Elizabeth Taylor
Elizabeth Taylor and Ireland had a close friendship and attended public events together. After Ireland received outspoken criticism for her uneven performance as an on-air host of ABC's 2010 pre-Oscar special, Taylor publicly defended Ireland; "I have never seen anyone epitomize glamour and grace and professionalism like she did." Ireland publicly credits Taylor as her mentor and for part of her success in life, business, design and philanthropy. Taylor bequeathed her Jean Hersholt Humanitarian Award to Ireland, in addition to leaving her a diamond jewelry collection, which Ireland wore at the 2018 American Heart Association's "Go Red for Women" Dress Show.

Activism and ambassador roles
Ireland is an ambassador for 9-1-1 For Kids, a non-profit organization that specializes in making educational materials to assist emergency dispatchers in teaching children the proper use of 9-1-1 and other general emergency preparedness tips. In an effort to encourage equality in women's athletics, Ireland has hosted several LPGA Golf Tournaments, including the Kathy Ireland Championship from 1999 to 2001 and the Kathy Ireland Greens.com LPGA Classic in 2000. On October 15, 2009, Ireland became an international ambassador for the Friends of Sheba Medical Center. The following year, she traveled to Israel to film a promotional documentary for the center; titled Holy Land Heroes, the film aims to reveal the work done at Sheba with wounded soldiers and terror victims. In 2019, Ireland was added as the first woman to the board of NFL Players Association. Ireland also joined the Women's National Basketball Players Association's (WNBPA) Board of Advocates that same year. Kathy Ireland joined the National Pediatric Cancer Foundation in 2020 as International Youth Chair. In March 2022, Ireland launched the National Pediatric Cancer Foundation’s “Music Funds the Cure’ and joined NPCF's International Youth Chair. Ireland reported by USA today is now a board member at lets talk interactive and she later declared war on the opioid crisis.

Honors and awards
On June 23, 2011, Ireland was honored by the Anti-Defamation League with the American Heritage Award, presented by the National Home Furnishings Industry. In 2012, Ireland received the Messenger of Peace Award at the Jewish National Fund Tree of Life Gala. The same year, Ireland was presented with an honorary Doctorate of Humane Letters by the California State University, which stated that she "generously uses her power and influence to benefit others, supporting social causes including empowering women, supporting young girls through mentoring, and providing opportunities for girls and women at risk." Ireland has been nominated as one of 17 finalists for the first Global Business & Interfaith Peace Award given by the Religious Freedom & Business Foundation (a U.S.-based nonprofit), and the United Nations Global Compact Business for Peace initiative. On October 13, 2017, at the "Meet Kathy Ireland Event" hosted by Amini, Ireland was presented with the key to the city of High Point, North Carolina. On July 15, 2021 Kathy Ireland was awarded the inaugural Business IRF Champion Award at the IRF Summit in Washington DC.

Personal life 
Ireland married physician Greg Olsen in 1988, and they have three children: Erik, Lily and Chloe. She is a devout Christian and an anti-abortion advocate. She has also been outspoken in her support for Israel.

Ireland's sister, Cynthia, has a child with Down syndrome. Ireland wrote an article about her niece and the need for an increase in research.
In 2009, Ireland appeared on Larry King Live to discuss her weight gain and women's health issues. She had gained a pound a year for 25 years and the cumulative effect had become obvious to her in a candid photograph her son had taken.

Filmography

Films

Television

References

External links

 
 
 

1963 births
Living people
20th-century American actresses
21st-century American actresses
Actresses from Glendale, California
Actresses from Santa Barbara, California
American businesspeople in retailing
American children's writers
American Christians
Female models from California
American film actresses
American non-fiction writers
American television actresses
American voice actresses
Participants in American reality television series
Writers from Glendale, California
Writers from Santa Barbara, California
Activists from California